Aleksei Sergeyev may refer to:

 Aleksei Alekseyevich Sergeyev (1930-2001), Soviet and Russian politician who ran for vice-president in the 1991 Russian presidential election <!-; see :ru:Сергеев, Алексей Алексеевич-->
 Aleksei Ivanovich Sergeyev, Russian politician, vice-governor of St. Petersburg as of 2009
 Aleksei Sergeyev (ice hockey), Russian hockey player who participated in the 2009 Men's Hockey Champions Challenge II
 Aleksei Sergeyev (referee), Russian football referee who officiated in the Russian Cup 2008–09
 Aleksei Sergeyevich Sergeyev (b. 1979), Russian footballer
 Alexei Sergeev Soloist of the Alexandrov Ensemble